Histoire de Détective (1929) is the third film by the Belgian director Charles Dekeukeleire. The film belongs to Dekeukeleire's avant-garde period and exudes the influence of the different avant-garde strands in Europe. Besides Histoire de Détective Dekeukeleire made three other avant-garde films: Combat de Boxe (1927), Impatience (1928) and Witte Vlam (1930).

Plot 
Detective T is charged by Madame Jonathan to shadow her husband, Monsieur Jonathan, due to his recent distant and distracted behavior. Monsieur Jonathan's travels lead them from Brussels to the Belgian coast, and to Luxembourg.

Credits 

 Director: Charles Dekeukeleire
 Screenplay: Maurice Casteels
 Starring: Pierre Bourgeois (Jonathan)
 Graphics: Victor Servranckx

References 

Storck H., ‘Hommage a Charles Dekeukeleire’, Travelling 56-57 (1980), 82 – 83.
Theys M., R. Michelems, e.a., De Belgische film. Le cinéma Belge. Belgian Film, Gent, 1999.
Thompson K., ‘(Re)Discovering Charles Dekeukeleire’, Millennium Film Journal  7/8/9 (1980–81). [Online raadpleegbaar op:] *http://www.davidbordwell.net/essays/dekeukeleire.php [13/11/’09]

Belgian drama road movies
1929 films
1920s French-language films
French-language Belgian films
1920s drama road movies